Saint-Marceau may refer to the following places in France:

 Saint-Marceau, Ardennes, a commune in the Ardennes department
 Saint-Marceau, Sarthe, a commune in the Sarthe department